The women's 200 metres at the 1971 European Athletics Championships was held in Helsinki, Finland, at Helsinki Olympic Stadium on 12 and 13 August 1971.

Medalists

Results

Final
13 August
Wind: 0.0 m/s

Semi-finals
12 August

Semi-final 1
Wind: 0 m/s

Semi-final 2
Wind: 0 m/s

Heats
12 August

Heat 1
Wind: 0 m/s

Heat 2
Wind: -0.2 m/s

Heat 3
Wind: 0 m/s

Heat 4
Wind: 0 m/s

Participation
According to an unofficial count, 20 athletes from 10 countries participated in the event.

 (1)
 (3)
 (1)
 (1)
 (2)
 (4)
 (1)
 (2)
 (2)
 (3)

References

200 metres
200 metres at the European Athletics Championships
1971 in women's athletics